Eupithecia supercastigata is a moth in the family Geometridae. It is found in Japan and Korea.

The wingspan is about 19 mm.

References

Moths described in 1958
supercastigata
Moths of Asia